Nico Tippelt (born 25 April 1967) is a German politician for the FDP and since 2021 is a member of the Bundestag, the federal diet.

Life and politics 
Tippelt was born in the East German city of Zwickau and studied music.

Since 2021 he is a member of the Bundestag.

References 

Living people
People from Zwickau
1967 births
Free Democratic Party (Germany) politicians
21st-century German politicians
Members of the Bundestag 2021–2025